Jackson is a 2015 Indian Kannada romantic comedy film directed by Sanath Kumar, a former editor who worked mostly with director Yogaraj Bhat, making his directorial debut. The film stars Duniya Vijay, Paavana Gowda along with Rangayana Raghu in the lead roles. The film is an official remake of the Tamil blockbuster film Idharkuthane Aasaipattai Balakumara (2013) which was directed by Gokul. The film opened on the screens on 15 January 2015.

Production

Development
Producers Sundar p Gowda and Anil bought the remake of the Tamil film just a week after its release. They approached their friend Duniya Vijay who accepted to play the lead role and help his friends produce the film in his home banner "Duniya Talkies". It was reported that he accepted the role and offered to work in it for free without any remuneration. The film was officially launched on 20 January 2014 in Bangalore co-inciding the birthday of Vijay.

Casting
After finalizing Vijay for the lead role, the producers approached actress Pavana Gowda of Gombegala Love fame to play the female lead reprising the role of Swati Reddy in the original version. Actor Rangayana Raghu was roped in to play a key supporting role. Also famous television actor Rajinikant has played an important character in the movie.

Cast

 Duniya Vijay as Jackson
 Paavana Gowda as Kumudha
 Rangayana Raghu
 Abhi ram
 Deepa Bhaskar
 Bullet Prakash
 Aishwarya Sindogi
 Nagendra Shah
 Satyajith
 Deepa
 Kote Prabhakar
 Rajinikant s as sapota

Soundtrack
Music composer Arjun Janya was finally roped in to score for both score and soundtrack after names such as Veer Samarth were doing rounds during the launch of the film. One track composed by Veer Samarth was retained in the final track list. The lyrics are written by Yogaraj Bhat and Chethan Kumar.

Reception

Critical response 

GS Kumar of The Times of India scored the film at 2.5 out of 5 stars and says "Vijay’s performance may impress only his fans. Aishwarya, who makes her presence felt as a romantic interest in a sub-plot in the movie, is better than Vrinda Pavana. Rangayana Raghu’s comic act brings some liveliness. Deepa, the dubbing artiste, outshines all with a captivating performance. Music by Arjun Janya is good." Shyam Prasad S of Bangalore Mirror scored the film at 2.5 out of 5 stars and says "Vijay's stunt sequences are a saving grace. The cinematography and art work are other aspects of the film that rise above the average."

References

External links
 

2015 films
2010s Kannada-language films
2015 romantic comedy films
Indian romantic comedy films
Films shot in India
Kannada remakes of Tamil films
2015 directorial debut films
Films scored by Arjun Janya